Batman (also known as Batman: The Movie) is an action video game developed and published by Ocean Software based on the 1989 film of the same name. It was released on 11 September 1989 for the  Commodore 64 and ZX Spectrum with Amiga, Amstrad CPC, Atari ST, MS-DOS and MSX versions following soon after.

Gameplay
The game consists of five levels based on events from the movie. Each stage has a time limit and a health gauge (represented by Batman's face turning into the Joker's), with Batman losing a life if he runs out of either. The levels have varying gameplay:

 In the first level, styled as side-scrolling gameplay, Batman fights his way through the Axis Chemical Plant to confront Jack Napier, knocking him into a vat of chemicals and turning him into the Joker. Batman can use his Batarangs and grapple gun to defeat enemies. The grapple gun can also be used to climb to higher platforms and swing across gaps.
 In the second level, Batman drives his Batmobile across Gotham City, dodging traffic and using a grapple to turn corners at high speed. Missing three consecutive turns causes Batman to run into a police roadblock and costs the player one life, regardless of the timer and health gauge.
 The third level is a Mastermind-like puzzle set in the Batcave, in which Batman is presented with eight consumer products and must identify the three that the Joker has tainted with the deadly chemical Smilex. The player chooses three items at a time and is told how many are correct; a health penalty is incurred for selecting any incorrect items.
 The fourth level takes place during the Joker's parade, in which Batman must fly the Batwing and cut away balloons filled with Smilex gas without crashing into them or the floats to which they are tethered.
 In the fifth and final level, styled similarly to the first, Batman climbs to the top of Gotham City Cathedral and must stop the Joker from escaping on a helicopter.

Release

Commodore UK reached an agreement with Ocean Software to bundle the game with Amiga 500 computers. Between October 1989 and September 1990, A500 machines were sold in the United Kingdom in Batman-themed boxes containing the game and The NewZealand Story, as well as F/A-18 Interceptor and Deluxe Paint II, both contributed by Electronic Arts. With an initial commission of 10,000 units, a total of 186,000 were sold at the end of the run, making it the most successful Amiga bundle ever sold by Commodore.

Reception
The game was number 1 in the Spectrum charts for February 1990 and was awarded Game of the Year in Crash magazine. Computer Gaming World recommended the Amiga version to action fans, but reported that the Commodore 64 version was too buggy, but was well received by Commodore Format magazine and was seen as one of the best movie tie-in games released for the platform.

References

External links

 

1989 video games
Action video games
Amiga games
Amstrad CPC games
Amstrad PCW games
Video games based on Batman films
Atari ST games
Batman (1989 film series)
Commodore 64 games
DOS games
Ocean Software games
Superhero video games
Video games based on adaptations
Video games based on films
ZX Spectrum games
Video games based on works by Tim Burton
Video games set in the United States
Video games developed in the United Kingdom